Judge Geordie is a British reality television series broadcast on MTV. The series was first announced in March 2015 and premiered on 3 June 2015. It features Vicky Pattison, a former cast member of Geordie Shore, settling feuds between friends, couples and family members.

Ratings

References

External links

2015 British television series debuts
2015 British television series endings
British reality television series
English-language television shows
MTV original programming